Dan, Danny, or Daniel Sullivan may refer to:

Arts and entertainment
 Daniel J. Sullivan (born 1940), American film and theater director
 Daniel G. Sullivan, American screenwriter
 Dan Sullivan (musician), indie rock musician
 Dan Panic, American punk rock drummer, real name Dan Sullivan
 Daniel Sullivan (countertenor) (died 1764), Irish opera singer
 Dan Sullivan (critic) American theater critic

Politics and government

United States
 Dan Sullivan (Anchorage mayor) (born 1951), Republican former mayor of Anchorage, Alaska
 Dan Sullivan (U.S. senator) (born 1964), Republican U.S. Senator from Alaska
 Daniel V. Sullivan (1886–1966), New York judge and district attorney
 Dan Sullivan (Arkansas politician), member of Arkansas State Senate

Others
 Dan Sullivan (New Zealand politician) (1882–1947), New Zealand politician
 Dan Sullivan (Australian politician) (born 1960), from Western Australia

Sports
 Dan Sullivan (baseball) (1857–1893), 19th-century Major League Baseball player
 Dan Sullivan (American football) (born 1939), former Baltimore Colts offensive lineman
 Daniel Sullivan (ice hockey, born 1947), former World Hockey Association goaltender
 Danny Sullivan (born 1950), American race car driver
 Danny Sullivan (rugby league) (born 1982), Australian rugby league player
 Danny Sullivan (born 1952), South African tennis player.
 Daniel Sullivan (American football), head college football coach for the Eureka College Red Devils
 Dan Sullivan (ice hockey, born 1981), Canadian ice hockey player
 Daniel Sullivan (ice hockey, born 1987), Canadian-born Italian ice hockey defenceman
 Danny Sullivan (footballer) (born 1994), association footballer for Torquay United F.C.

Other people
 Danny Sullivan (technologist) (born 1965), American search engine expert
 Daniel Sullivan (Great Chicago Fire), American involved in the Great Chicago Fire
 Daniel Augustus Joseph Sullivan (1884–1941), American naval officer; Medal of Honor recipient
 Daniel Sullivan (entrepreneur), American entrepreneur and business executive
 Daniel Sullivan (frontiersman) (died 1790), 18th-century military figure in the North American frontier
 Daniel "Horse-Whisperer" Sullivan (died 1810), Irish horse trainer
 Daniel Y. Sullivan (1948–2012), American dentist

Fictional characters
 Dan Sullivan (EastEnders), a character from the BBC soap opera EastEnders
 Danny Sullivan (Dream Team), a character from the British television series Dream Team